Mamou is a town in Evangeline Parish, Louisiana, United States. The population was 3,242 at the 2010 census, down from 3,566 in 2000.

Geography
Mamou is located in south-central Evangeline Parish at  (30.634033, −92.418913). Louisiana Highway 13 follows the western border of the town, leading north  to Reddell and south  to Eunice.

History
There are many stories regarding the origin of the name "Mamou". One may have been the legendary Indian, Chief Mamou. It is certain that this vast prairie was known as "Mamou Prairie" as far back as the 18th century and that Anglo-Americans first called it "Mammouth Prairie" because of its immense size. When the French came, they called it "Mamou" for mammoth. "Mamou" is also a family name found in France.

Within this vast stretch of prairie, the town site of Mamou was platted in 1907 by Curley C. Duson of Eunice. He was president of the Mamou Town Site Company which opened an office on the corner of Seventh and Chestnut. Lot auctions were held weekly and lots were sold for $50. The original village covered one square mile. On January 11, 1911, Mamou was incorporated.

Cotton was the major crop for many years on the prairie. By 1915, the village boasted four cotton gins producing thousands of bales of cotton; however, the decline in the demand for cotton led local farmers toward the growing of rice that is now the major crop of the area.

Demographics

2020 census

As of the 2020 United States census, there were 2,936 people, 1,128 households, and 615 families residing in the town.

2000 census
As of the census of 2000, there were 3,566 people, 1,426 households, and 902 families residing in the town. The racial makeup of the town was 60.96% White, 37.75% African American, 0.22% Native American, 0.06% Asian, 0.03% Pacific Islander, 0.06% from other races, and 0.93% from two or more races. Hispanic or Latino of any race were 0.73% of the population.

There were 1,426 households, out of which 32.5% had children under the age of 18 living with them, 38.6% were married couples living together, 20.5% had a female householder with no husband present, and 36.7% were non-families. 33.5% of all households were made up of individuals, and 16.2% had someone living alone who was 65 years of age or older. The average household size was 2.39 and the average family size was 3.05.

In the town, the population was spread out, with 28.3% under the age of 18, 8.7% from 18 to 24, 23.6% from 25 to 44, 20.8% from 45 to 64, and 18.7% who were 65 years of age or older. The median age was 36 years. For every 100 females, there were 84.0 males. For every 100 females age 18 and over, there were 76.6 males.

The median income for a household in the town was $12,988, and the median income for a family was $17,295. Males had a median income of $21,250 versus $13,250 for females. The per capita income for the town was $9,046. About 37.4% of families and 45.0% of the population were below the poverty line, including 50.6% of those under age 18 and 37.5% of those age 65 or over.

Education
Public schools in Evangeline Parish are operated by the Evangeline Parish School Board. Three campuses serve the town of Mamou – Mamou Elementary School (Grades PK–4), Mamou Upper Elementary (Grades 5–8), and Mamou High School (Grades 9–12). Mamou Upper Elementary and Mamou High School are located on the same campus.

Culture
Mamou is located at the heart of Louisiana's Cajun country. The town is famous for its music and musicians, and bills itself as "The Cajun Music Capital of the World". Consequently, Mamou figures into a number of song titles (such as "'Tit Galop Pour Mamou," "Valse de Grand Mamou," "Mamou Two-Step," and "Mamou Hot Step") and lyrics such as "Somewhere Over China" by Jimmy Buffett, as well as band names (such as Steve Riley and the Mamou Playboys). Mamou is also home of the world-famous Fred's Lounge, which features live Cajun music every Saturday morning. Each year the town holds a Courir de Mardi Gras.

Notable people

Danny Ardoin, Major League Baseball player 
Lewis Elliott Chaze, journalist and author
Chris Duhon, professional basketball player
Barry Manuel, Major League Baseball, Louisiana State University All-American
Jimmy C. Newman, singer
Steve Riley, Cajun and zydeco accordionist, singer, and bandleader
Austin Deculus, professional football player in the NFL
Keith Sonnier, visual artist

References

External links

Mamou from Louisiana State University at Eunice's Central Acadiana Gateway site

Towns in Evangeline Parish, Louisiana
Towns in Louisiana
Populated places established in 1907